The 2021 Asia-Oceania Judo Championships were held in Bishkek, Kyrgyzstan from April 6 to April 9, 2021.

Medal summary

Men

Women

Mixed

Medal table

References

External links
 

Asian Judo Championships
Oceanian Judo Championships
Asian Championships
Asian-Pacific Judo Championships
International sports competitions hosted by Kyrgyzstan
Asian-Pacific Judo Championships
Sport in Bishkek